A timeline of electronic music genres, with a date of origin, the locale of origin, and music samples.

See also
List of electronic music genres
Electronic music
Electronic dance music
Styles of house music
List of trance genres

References

Electronic music genres